The Fisheries Act 1981 (1981 c. 29) was an Act of Parliament of the Parliament of the United Kingdom.

With regards to the sea fishing industry, the Act established the Sea Fish Industry Authority, which was given the duty to promote the efficiency of the industry in the UK, and provided for financial assistance to the industry.

The Act also made new provisions with regard to fish farming, and enabled the Department of Agriculture for Northern Ireland to spend money on fisheries protection in Northern Irish waters.

See also
Fisheries Act

References
Whitaker's Almanack: for the year 1982, complete edition, p. 363. J. Whitaker & Sons, London, 1981
Chronological table of the statutes; HMSO, London. 1993.

Web Resources
Sea Fish Industry Authority website; Fisheries Act 1981 PDF
Office of Public Sector Information; Fisheries Act 1981 HTML

1981 in the environment
United Kingdom Acts of Parliament 1981
Fisheries law
Fishing in the United Kingdom